Uruguay held local government elections on September 27, 2020, to elect the intendente of the 19 departments that are the administrative divisions of Uruguay, as well as 31 councilors; and a mayor and four councilors for each of the municipalities. Across the country, 19 intendants, 589 ediles, 125 mayors and 500 councilors will be elected. This will be the second time that both intendentes and alcaldes are elected simultaneously.

Initially, the election was to be held on May 10, however, in March 2020 all the political parties that made up the General Assembly, the Electoral Court and Vice President Beatriz Argimón, in a joint decision, agreed to postpone for the only time for Sunday, September 27, 2020 due to the coronavirus pandemic in the country.

Election by department 
In the municipal elections of May 2015, the Partido Nacional had won 12 departments, the Partido Colorado 1 departments, and the Frente Amplio 6 departments.

Artigas

Canelones

Cerro Largo

Colonia

Durazno

Flores

Florida

Lavalleja

Maldonado

Montevideo

Paysandú

Río Negro

Rivera

Rocha

Salto

San José

Soriano

Tacuarembó

Treinta y Tres

See also 
2019 Uruguayan general election

References

External links 
  

Local and municipal elections in Uruguay
Uruguay
Municipal elections
September 2020 events in South America